The South Australian Football Budget is the matchday programme of the South Australian National Football League (SANFL).

History
A publication known as the SA Football Budget was first produced in 1914 but was discontinued due to the onset of the First World War. After the return of competition the magazine returned as the SA Footballer, later changing to the current name. The Budget is a 32-page publication. At its core are the lists of teams playing each weekend, along with player statistics and details of umpires. Contents include footballer profiles, action photography, columns, mini-league teams, premierships tables and various statistics. The regular cost of the magazine is $3. The Grand Final issue has more pages and is $5. The magazine is owned by the South Australian National Football League (SANFL) and has been published by Boylen Media for the last 18 years, on behalf of the SANFL. The equivalent magazine for the Australian Football League (AFL) is the Football Record which was first produced in 1912.

The Budget is sold at all SANFL league matches and also at newsstands in Rundle Mall in Adelaide, South Australia.

See also

References

South Australian National Football League
Sports magazines published in Australia
Magazines established in 1914
1914 establishments in Australia
Weekly magazines published in Australia
Mass media in Adelaide